David Tollett (born March 30, 1966) is an American college baseball coach who has been the head coach of Florida Gulf Coast since 2002, the program's first season.  Under Tollett, the Eagles have appeared in two NCAA Division I Tournaments and won Atlantic Sun Conference (A-Sun) regular season championships in 2008, 2009, 2010, 2014, 2019, and 2021.Tollett's 2017 season was the most successful in program history as the Green and Blue won a program record 43 games, claimed the program's first ASUN Tournament Championship, and advanced to the NCAA Tournament for the first time. After starting the season 24-3 and defeating then #2 and eventual National Champion Florida, then #1 FSU and Miami in the same season for the first time ever, FGCU rose to as high as #9 in the Collegiate Baseball News poll - marking the highest ranking ever achieved by any athletics program in school history. Following the hot start to the season, Tollett was named the Perfect Game Midseason Coach of the Year. The Green and Blue suffered a number of tough losses in April, but ended the regular season by sweeping its way through its final three conference series and earned the No. 3 seed in the ASUN Tournament. After falling into the loser's bracket following a loss on day two, FGCU won an improbable four elimination games in less than 30 hours and defeated top-seeded Jacksonville twice, including an extra-inning thriller in the winner-take-all championship. With the ASUN's automatic bid to the NCAA Tournament in hand, the Eagles earned the No. 2 seed in the Chapel Hill Regional and defeated No. 3 Michigan, 10-6, in its first-ever NCAA Tournament game. Tollett was named the A-Sun Coach of the Year in 2008, 2009, 2010, 2014, and 2019.  Worst loss of career came during the 2013 season when Tollett and the Eagles lost to an NAIA school, Ave Maria. Tollett has had 47 players at FGCU drafted or signed as free agents in Major League Baseball including Chris Sale, Casey Coleman, Richard Bleier, Jacob Barnes, Jacob Noll, and Kutter Crawford.

Head coaching record
Below is a table of Tollett's yearly records as a collegiate head baseball coach.

See also
 List of current NCAA Division I baseball coaches
 Florida Gulf Coast Eagles

Notes

References

Living people
1966 births
Florida Gulf Coast Eagles baseball coaches
Tusculum Pioneers baseball players
Baseball coaches from Florida
High school baseball coaches in the United States